The Sydney Fish Market is a fish market in Sydney, New South Wales, Australia. The market sits on the Blackwattle Bay foreshore in Pyrmont, 2 kilometres west of the Sydney central business district.  It is the world's third largest fish market.

Features
Sydney Fish Market incorporates a working fishing port, wholesale fish market, fresh seafood retail market, a delicatessen, a sushi bar, a bakery, a gift shop, a fruit and vegetable market, a new meat deli, a beverage outlet, a seafood cooking school, indoor seating and an outdoor promenade for visitors. There are daily wholesale auctions for Sydney's seafood retailers.

History

Earlier fish markets in Sydney 

The original Fish Market was established, in 1871, at Woolloomooloo, then and for many years later the mooring site of the local Sydney fishing fleet. It expanded over time to occupy the block bounded by Bourke, Plunkett, Forbes and Wilson Streets, Woolloomooloo.

Unhygienic conditions at the Woolloomooloo market and the extension of railways to the coastal areas to the north of Sydney led to the formation, in 1891, of a second, more modern, privately-owned fish market—known as the 'Southern Fish Market'—located at Redfern Street,  Redfern.  In 1892, the Woolloomooloo market was expanded for the last time, then becoming known as the 'Eastern Market'. The Sydney City Council had passed a bylaw requiring that any fish sold in Sydney was first inspected at the Woolloomooloo market, jeopardising the railway-based business model of the Redfern market and its ability to directly market fish from Botany. In 1897, the 'Southern Market' buildings were for sale at auction but the market operations continued, opening a new building in 1903.  Around 1907-1908, the Woolloomooloo market was taken over by the Sydney City Council, without compensation; that led to the exodus of some agents to the 'Southern Market', which was further expanded in 1910 after being incorporated as Commonwealth Cooperative Fish Exchange Limited in 1908.

A newer Municipal Fish Market, opened in 1911, at the corner of Thomas and Engine Streets in the Haymarket area; it was also known as the 'City Fish Market'. It was a part of the produce market complex  that the Sydney City Council had constructed in the Haymarket. The original market at Woolloomooloo continued to operate, but in a greatly diminished form.

For a  time, Sydney had three separate 'fish markets'; the privately-owned market at Redfern was in open conflict with the City Council, owner of the 'City' and old Woolloomooloo markets. The Council had the backing of the N.S.W. State Government, which passed an Act—The Sydney Corporation (Fish Markets) Act, 1922 (Act No. 39, 1922)—that empowered the City Council to acquire the assets of Commonwealth Cooperative Fish Exchange Limited and to centralize fish marketing operations in Sydney at the Municipal Market.

The end of the 'Southern Market' came in early 1923. The Colonial Secretary of NSW, Charles Oakes, had refused to renew licences of fish agents who operated at the Redfern market and the Fisherman's Union agreed to only supply fish to the 'City Fish Market', which subsequently became a profitable monopoly; that forced the Redfern agents to move to Haymarket and the City Council purchased the disused Redfern market building. The Redfern market building became a hostel for the unemployed during the Great Depression. The dormant 'Eastern Market' site at Woolloomooloo was sold to John Wren in 1926.

The Fish Market remained in Haymarket, until it relocated to its current location at Blackwattle Bay in 1966.

Current market at Blackwattle Bay 
The wholesale marketing of fish in Sydney originally was in the hands of licensed agents at Haymarket. At places other than Sydney, unlicensed operators—most typically fishermen's cooperatives—marketed fish. The Fish Marketing Authority was established in 1964, by the NSW State Government, and it established a regulated wholesale market. The new organisation relocated the Fish Market to Blackwattle Bay in 1966.

During the 1980s, new buildings were erected. These both provided an improved auction floor and expanded the secondary role of the Sydney Fish Market as a visitor attraction and retail venue.

Until 1989, fish was sold, under a traditional 'voice' auction, to the highest bidder. A computerised Dutch auction system was introduced in October 1989, greatly increasing the efficiency of the sale process.

The Sydney Fish Market was privatised, in 1994, as Sydney Fish Market Pty Ltd. This company is owned in equal parts by the harvesting and marketing sectors of the N.S.W. seafood industry—the Catchers Trust of N.S.W. and the Sydney Fish Market Tenants and Merchants Pty Ltd.

Between 1997 and 1999, fish marketing was deregulated in stages and the Sydney Fish Market lost its monopoly in Sydney. However, the efficiency and scale of the auctioning operations at Blackwattle Bay means that a large amount of seafood still goes through the Sydney Fish Market.

Although it draws over 3.5-million visitors per year, in recent years, there has been criticism of the aesthetics and environmental aspects of the market facilities. Earlier plans to upgrade the market site have not eventuated and the site has been described as dirty and smelly; authentic perhaps, but not an ideal tourist destination.

Future planned redevelopment 
On 7 November 2016, the New South Wales Government announced the market would move to a new 35,000 sq m complex on an adjacent site. The new complex will include 15,500 sq m of seafood retail space – compared with 6582 sq m of space for the existing site. On 17 June 2020, the New South Wales Government approved the final plans for the new markets. Completion is scheduled for late 2024. 

The redevelopment forms part of the New South Wales Government's Bays Precinct urban renewal program.

Mural 
The mural inside Sydney Fish Market was designed by Australian artist Keith Howland. It is made up of about 400 hundred individually glazed ceramic tiles and measures eight metres long and four metres wide and was installed in 1990. It took the artist about 12 months to complete and it depicts the fishing industry in New South Wales from Yamba on the Far North Coast to Sydney.

Transport
The Fish Market tram stop on the L1 Dulwich Hill Line is located nearby. The market is also served by the 501 bus route.

See also
 Balmain Bug
 Markets in Sydney
 Sydney Rock Oyster

References

External links

 S. Colley and R. Brownlee 2010 'Archaeological Fish Bones Online: a digital archive of Sydney fishes', Internet Archaeology 29.
Sydney Fish Market

Retail markets in Sydney
Fish markets
Pyrmont, New South Wales
Food markets in Australia
Food and drink companies based in Sydney